Bien de Interés Cultural is a category in the Spanish heritage register.  It covers various types of cultural heritage, which fall into sub-categories such as monuments, historic gardens, etc.

By province 

 A Coruña
 Álava
 Albacete
 Alicante
 Almería
 Asturias
 Ávila
 Badajoz
 Balearic Islands
 Barcelona
 Biscay
 Burgos
 Cáceres
 Cádiz
 Cantabria
 Castellón
 Ciudad Real
 Córdoba
 Cuenca
 Gipuzkoa
 Girona
 Granada
 Guadalajara
 Huelva
 Huesca
 Jaén
 La Rioja
 Las Palmas
 León
 Lleida
 Lugo
 Madrid
 Málaga
 Murcia
 Navarre
 Ourense
 Palencia
 Pontevedra
 Salamanca
 Santa Cruz de Tenerife
 Segovia
 Seville
 Soria
 Tarragona
 Teruel
 Toledo
 Valencia
 Valladolid
 Zamora
 Zaragoza

Other areas 
 Ceuta
 Melilla

See also 
 Bien de Interés Cultural
 Patrimonio histórico español